Lưu Thị Diễm Hương is a beauty pageant winner and student who won the title of Miss Vietnam World 2010. Diễm Hương was born on August 30, 1990 in Ho Chi Minh City, Vietnam. Diễm Hương did not go to Miss World 2010 but she was sent to represent Vietnam in the Miss Earth 2010 pageant in Nha Trang, Vietnam.

Miss Earth 2010
Diễm Hương represented Vietnam in Miss Earth 2010 pageant where she placed in the Top 14 of the final night despite being a heavy favorite along with the winner. She also made the Top 5 Miss Talent competition and also won the Best in Swimsuit award. Nicole Faria from India was crowned by Miss Earth 2009 Larissa Ramos from Brazil.

Miss Universe 2012
Diễm Hương was appointed by the national franchise holder to compete at Miss Universe 2012 in Las Vegas, Nevada, USA. Despite being an early favorite and popularity from previous pageant, she did not place in Top 16. Olivia Culpo from United States crowned this year.

Personal life
It was revealed in 2014 that she married in 2011, before competing in Miss Universe 2012. Her old husband, Đinh Trường Chinh had complaint to divorce. She became the first Vietnam's representative at Miss Universe when married.  However she was allowed to keep her title.

She remarried with Quang Huy in 2015, has a child and has opened a bakery of her own. They divorced in 2020 and now she is a single-mom.

References

Living people
Miss Universe 2012 contestants
Miss Earth 2010 contestants
1990 births
People from Ho Chi Minh City
Vietnamese beauty pageant winners